Varyagi Vsevolozhski Rayon or SKA Varyagi is a Russian ice hockey team that plays in the MHL. The team was established in 2014.

Sources 

Ice hockey teams in Russia
Ice hockey clubs established in 2014
2014 establishments in Russia